Terence Kent (born 21 October 1939) is an English former sportsman who played both association football and cricket professionally.

Football career
Kent made one league appearance in the 1958–59 season for Southend United. He later joined Millwall, but never played.

Cricket career
Kent left Millwall in 1960, and made 10 first-class appearances for Essex between 1960 and 1962.

References

1939 births
Living people
English footballers
Southend United F.C. players
Millwall F.C. players
English cricketers
Essex cricketers
Association football midfielders